is a Japanese former football player and manager.

Playing career
Takahata was born in Takatsuki on June 16, 1968. After graduating from Osaka University of Health and Sport Sciences, he joined Fujitsu in 1991. He retired in 1995.

Coaching career
After retirement, in 1996, Takahata became a coach at Fujitsu (later Kawasaki Frontale). In April 2008, manager Takashi Sekizuka resigned for health reasons, Takahata managed the club. In 2009, Sekizuka came back to a manager, Takahata returned to a coach. In 2010, Takahata became a manager again as Sekizuka successor. He left the club end of 2013 season and he became a manager for J.League U-22 Selection.

Managerial statistics

References

External links

Profile at Kawasaki Frontale in 2010

1968 births
Living people
Osaka University of Health and Sport Sciences alumni
Association football people from Osaka Prefecture
People from Takatsuki, Osaka
Japanese footballers
Japan Soccer League players
Japan Football League (1992–1998) players
Kawasaki Frontale players
Japanese football managers
J1 League managers
J3 League managers
Kawasaki Frontale managers
J.League U-22 Selection managers
Association football midfielders